This is the progression of world record improvements of the 400 metres hurdles M35 division of Masters athletics.

Key

References

Masters Athletics 400 m hurdles list

Masters athletics world record progressions